This is a list of video games that center upon the fictional character of Nancy Drew. Some of the games are adaptations of various Nancy Drew books, while others are not.

The games for computer and mobile, some of which were ported to game consoles, have been developed and published by Her Interactive. Original console games have been published by Majesco Entertainment and THQ.

Computer and mobile games
All computer and mobile games featuring Nancy Drew have been developed and published by Her Interactive.

Nancy Drew series

Nancy Drew Dossier series

Mobile games

Nintendo DS games

References

Nancy Drew